Darren Manning (born 30 April 1975) is a British motor racing driver who has raced in the IRL IndyCar Series for Chip Ganassi Racing and Dreyer & Reinbold Racing.

Career history

Early career
Manning was born in Knaresborough, North Yorkshire, and began his racing career at the age of 10, competing in British and International karting events.  In 1992, he took part in the Brands Hatch Formula First Winter Series, finishing second after recording two wins.  His SpeedSport team took him in 1993 to race in the Formula Vauxhall championship again recording 2 victories en route to a second-place finish in the championship.  He was also a finalist for the McLaren Autosport Young Driver of the Year award.  He continued in Formula Vauxhall in 1994 and 1995 and moved up to Formula 3 in 1996 and 1997.  Budget constraints meant that he only raced a limited F3 schedule in 1998, but he did achieve two wins including at Silverstone for the British Grand Prix support race.

International career

In 1999 Darren won the All-Japan Formula Three championship, and was the first driver to achieve the "perfect victory" at the Macau Grand Prix since Ayrton Senna by winning from pole position, leading every lap and setting a lap record.  He also tested with the Williams F1 team.  In 2000 he began working for the BAR Honda F1 team as a test driver while also racing in the FIA International Formula 3000 championship for Arden Team Russia.

In 2002 he competed in the ASCAR (now SCSA) championship.  He had a one-off drive in the FIA Sportscar championship at Magny-Cours driving a Tampolli SR2 RTA-2001 in the SR2 class for JCI Developments. He also had a one-off drive at Rockingham in the CART series for Team St George, leading 18 laps on the way to 9th place.  This led to a full-time drive for Walker Racing in 2003, taking one top-3 finish and 9th overall in the championship.

He joined Chip Ganassi's IRL team for 2004, in place of Tony Renna after Renna's fatal testing accident, finishing 11th in the championship having achieved 8 top-ten finishes, but he was released from his contract in the middle of 2005 after 24 starts, including the 2004 and 2005 Indianapolis 500.

He raced at the last round of the 2005/6 A1 Grand Prix series at Shanghai, because main driver Robbie Kerr had other commitments and Darren helped secure A1 Team Great Britain third place in the overall standings. During 2006 he also drove a Nissan 350Z in the FIA GT Championship for RJN Motorsport.

For the 2006-07 A1 Grand Prix season he moved into a permanent role in the Great Britain A1GP team, alongside Robbie Kerr and Oliver Jarvis.

On 14 November 2006, Manning was named the driver of the A. J. Foyt Enterprises No. 14 car in the IRL IndyCar series for the 2007 season, marking his return to the league after a one-year absence. Manning also drove in the 2007 24 Hours of Daytona and led his team to a second-place finish, leading the race during a long overnight stint in the rain. He finished 13th in IndyCar points in 2007, capturing 5 top-tens in what was widely considered a significant step forward for the previously struggling Foyt team. In 2008 he finished second at Watkins Glen, with six further top ten finishes en route to 14th overall.

In 2009, he was racing for Dreyer & Reinbold Racing in IndyCar, but left after two races.  No reason has been given by either driver or team.

In 2010 Manning drove for Spirit of Daytona Racing in the Rolex 24 Hours of Daytona in the number 90 Daytona Prototype.

Motorsports career results

Complete International Formula 3000 results
(key) (Races in bold indicate pole position) (Races in italics indicate fastest lap)

American Open-Wheel
(key)

CART

IndyCar Series

 1 Run on same day.
 2 Non-points-paying, exhibition race.Complete A1 Grand Prix results
(key) (Races in bold indicate pole position) (Races in italics'' indicate fastest lap)

Complete American Le Mans Series results

References

External links

Indy Racing League stats page

1975 births
Living people
IndyCar Series drivers
English racing drivers
FIA GT Championship drivers
A1 Team Great Britain drivers
Champ Car drivers
Indianapolis 500 drivers
Auto GP drivers
British Formula Three Championship drivers
Japanese Formula 3 Championship drivers
People from Knaresborough
International Formula 3000 drivers
24 Hours of Daytona drivers
American Le Mans Series drivers
European Le Mans Series drivers
Porsche Supercup drivers
Sportspeople from Yorkshire
ASCAR drivers
Arden International drivers
Dale Coyne Racing drivers
Walker Racing drivers
Chip Ganassi Racing drivers
A. J. Foyt Enterprises drivers
Dreyer & Reinbold Racing drivers
OAK Racing drivers
TOM'S drivers